"123" is a shared cash network for the banking community in Egypt. It is provided by Egyptian Banks Co. for Technological Advancement (EBC).

Services 
The "123" network links more than 30 Egyptian Banks supporting more than 1500 ATMs distributed all over Egypt.  This network provides the banks' clients with direct access to their different accounts at any time and from anywhere through the ATMs carrying the "123" logo.
This network is available 24 hours a day 7 days a week.

In addition, the "123" network is a gateway to MasterCard, Diners Club and American Express International networks. Moreover, it is linked to regional networks in the Persian Gulf states, NAPS in State of Qatar, Benefit in Kingdom of Bahrain and CSCBank SAL in Lebanon.

Benefits:
 Convenience
 Security
 Helping to promote a cashless society
 Enhanced debit and credit services
 Source of revenue to banks

Member banks in the network 
 Arab African International Bank
 Arab Banking Corporation – Egypt
 Bank of Alexandria
 Alexandria Commercial & Maritime Bank
 ARAB Bank
 Barclays – Egypt
 Banque du Caire
 Blom Bank (Misr Romanian Bank)
 Banque Misr
 BNP Paribas Le Caire
 Calyon Bank Egypt
 Cairo Far East Bank
 Commercial International Bank
 National Bank of Abu Dhabi
 Delta International Bank
 Egyptian American Bank
 Egyptian ARAB Land Bank
 Piraeus Bank (Egyptian Commercial Bank)
 Export Development Bank of Egypt
 Egyptian Gulf Bank
 Egyptian Saudi Finance Bank
 Faisal Islamic Bank of Egypt
 Housing & Development Bank
 HSBC
 Misr International Bank
 Misr Iran Development Bank
 National Bank for Development
 National Bank of Oman
 National Societe Generale Bank
 Societe Arab Internationale de Banque
 United Bank Of Egypt
 Al Watany Bank of Egypt
 Egypt Post
 National Bank of Egypt

References

External links 
 

Banks of Egypt
Companies based in Cairo
Interbank networks